The Radio-Technical Troops (RTT) (Russian: Радиотехнические войска) are an Arm of the Russian Aerospace Forces, armed with radio-technical equipment (RTE) and systems of automation means (SAM), are designed to conduct radar reconnaissance of the air enemy and to give radar information on the air situation within the radar field to control bodies of the Aerospace Forces and other Services and Arms of the Russian Armed Forces, points of control of aircraft combat means, anti-aircraft missile troops and electronic warfare (EW) at their solving the tasks of peacetime and wartime.

The RTT of the Aerospace Forces consist of radio-technical regiments (RTR), which are organised as part of an Air Force Association (air army), as well as an air defence division, other units and organisations directly under the Commander-in-Chief of the Air Force.

The Radio-Technical Troops of the Aerospace Forces are the primary source of radar data on air situation. They carry out radar reconnaissance and provide with radar information combat crews of higher command posts (CPs) and CPs of formations, military units and aviation subdivisions, anti-aircraft missile troops and electronic warfare troops.

In peacetime, all the deployed subunits and command posts of formations and units of the Radio-Technical Troops carry out combat duty on air defence, perform tasks for protection of state borders in the airspace.

In the course of events during transition to the new make-up of the RF Armed Forces the main aim became improving the control system, maintaining combat readiness of units and subdivisions according to the degree fulfilling the task as intended.

The main account at equipping troops with electronic technology is devoted to increasing opportunities for subunits’ manoeuvrability and their ability to give combat operational information in a new position area within the shortest possible time.

The main directions of development of the Radio-Technical Troops of the Aerospace Forces are as follows: improving the technical equipment of military units and subdivisions by carrying out activities on life extension and modernisation of existing weapons and equipment, development of weapons of the new park: radar systems of medium and high altitudes ‘Nebo-M’, radars of medium and high altitudes ‘Protivnik-G1M’, ‘Sopka-2’, radar systems of low altitudes ‘Podlyot-K1’ and ‘Podlyot-M’, radars of low altitudes ‘Kasta-2-2’.

References

External links

Russian Air Force
Military units and formations established in 1954
1954 establishments in Russia